Graupner may refer to:

 Adolphus E. Graupner (1875-1947), judge of the United States Board of Tax Appeals
 Christoph Graupner (1683-1760), a German harpsichordist and composer 
 Johann Christian Gottlieb Graupner (1767-1836), a German musician, composer, educator and publisher
 Roland Graupner, a German sprint canoer
 Graupner (company), a German manufacturer of radio controlled models and equipment.